McKnight Mountain is the highest peak in the Black Range of southwestern New Mexico, in the southwestern United States.

The mountain is topped by a flat ridge running roughly north–south for about one-half mile; the north and south ends of the ridge are both listed at 10,165 feet.  The mountain is forested up to near its summit, which is rocky and provides panoramic views.  Its west slopes are the headwaters of the East Fork of the Mimbres River, which flows through McKnight Canyon, and its northwest slopes also feed into the Mimbres.  The east side is drained by Las Animas Creek, which flows into the Rio Grande at Caballo Lake.  While the Continental Divide runs along much of the Black Range, McKnight Mountain is not on the divide itself, which separates from the crest of the Black Range at Red Peak a few miles to the north.

McKnight Mountain is accessible via several trails. Another, Trail 82, approaches the peak from the west through McKnight Canyon.

References

External links 
 

Mountains of New Mexico
Landforms of Sierra County, New Mexico
Landforms of Grant County, New Mexico
Gila National Forest
Mountains of Sierra County, New Mexico